Werner Georg Kümmel (Heidelberg 16 May 1905 - Mainz 9 July 1995) was a German New Testament scholar and professor at the University of Marburg.

Biography
Kümmel was the son of the Heidelberg doctor Werner Kümmel and his first wife Marie (a daughter of the historian Heinrich Ulmann). He was a grandson of the civil engineer Werner Kümmel and a nephew of the art historian Otto Kümmel, as well as a great-grandson of the physician Jacob Henle through his mother.
 
From 1923 to 1928 he studied Protestant theology in Heidelberg, Berlin and Marburg, graduating in Heidelberg. He wrote his dissertation on Romans 7 in 1928, under the supervision of Martin Dibelius. He then worked at universities in England, followed by Marburg (1930-1932), where he was assistant to Hans von Soden, Zurich (1932-1950), Mainz (1951/1952) and Marburg again (1952-1973). At Marburg he succeeded Rudolf Bultmann, and worked until his retirement in 1973 as a New Testament scholar.

Kümmel undertook the editing of Jewish writings from Hellenistic-Roman times. His Einleitung in das Neue Testament (Introduction to the New Testament) was influential, and competed with the conservatism of Wilhelm Michaelis and the Catholic perspective of Alfred Wikenhauser in their works of the same title.

The Bonn New Testament scholar Erich Gräßer was a student of Kümmel's.

Works

Thesis

Books
 
  - (trans. pub. by London: SCM Press, 1956)
  - (trans. pub. by London: Epworth, 1961)).
  - (trans. pub. by London: SCM Press, 1972)
 
  - (trans. pub. by London: SCM Press, 1972)
 
  - (It is a complete revision of Paul Feine and Johannes Behm's book, first published in 1918; from 1973 on will it have Kümmel's name as its main author) (trans. by Howard Clark Kee in 1993 as ''Introduction to the New Testament, Nashville: Abingdon Press)

Chapters

References

1905 births
1995 deaths
New Testament scholars
Corresponding Fellows of the British Academy